Kirkgate is the name of:

 Kirkgate, Leeds, a street in England
 Kirkgate, Leith, a street in Scotland
 Wakefield Kirkgate railway station, a station in England